Alaeddin Mosque is a historical mosque in Jugra, Kuala Langat District, Selangor, Malaysia. In 2008, the mosque was gazetted as a National Heritage Site (Tapak Warisan Negara).

Also known as Masjid Alaeddin and Masjid Bandar, the mosque was built in 1918 and officiated by a former Sultan of Selangor, Sultan Alaeddin Suleiman Shah Ibni Raja Muda Musa in 1924.

History
The mosque was constructed between 1903 and 1905, and was officially opened in 1906 by Almarhum Sultan Sir Alaeddin Sulaiman Shah of Selangor.

Architecture
The architectural style of the mosque is influenced by design elements from the Sultanate of Deli Kingdom from North Sumatera, Indonesia.

See also
 Islam in Malaysia

References

Mosques in Selangor
Mosques completed in 1905
1905 establishments in British Malaya
Mosque buildings with domes